Igor Anatolyevich Ponomaryov (born 24 February 1960 in Baku) is a retired Soviet football player and currently manager of the Khazar Lankaran.

Honours
 Olympic Champion: 1988
 UEFA European Under-19 Football Championship winner: 1978
 1979 FIFA World Youth Championship runner-up: 1979
 Holds the record for most penalty kicks scored in a row without misses in the Soviet Top League (24)

International career
Ponomaryov played his only game for USSR on 4 December 1980 in a friendly against Argentina.

Personal life
He is the father of Anatoli Ponomarev. Both hold Swedish passports.

References

External links
 Profile 

1960 births
Living people
Azerbaijani footballers
Expatriate footballers in Sweden
Soviet footballers
Soviet expatriate footballers
Soviet Union international footballers
Azerbaijani football managers
Azerbaijan national football team managers
Azerbaijani expatriate football managers
PFC CSKA Moscow players
IFK Norrköping players
Qarabağ FK managers
Olympic footballers of the Soviet Union
Olympic gold medalists for the Soviet Union
Footballers at the 1988 Summer Olympics
Olympic medalists in football
Khazar Lankaran FK managers
Footballers from Baku
Medalists at the 1988 Summer Olympics
Association football midfielders
Neftçi PFK players
Soviet Top League players
Allsvenskan players
Soviet expatriate sportspeople in Sweden
Expatriate football managers in Russia
Expatriate football managers in Sweden